Kandej (also Romanized as Kandaj and Kondaj; also known as Kandījh and Kanj) is a village in Kharrazan Rural District, in the Central District of Tafresh County, Markazi Province, Iran. At the 2006 census, its population was 209, in 88 families.

References 

Populated places in Tafresh County